Maria Nichiforov (later Mihoreanu, 9 April 1951–24 June 2022) was a Romanian sprint canoer. She won four medals at the world championships with a silver in 1974 and bronzes in 1973, 1974 and 1975. At the 1972 Olympics she won a bronze medal in the K-2 500 m event and placed sixth in the singles. She is a sister-in-law of the Olympic canoer Maria Ştefan-Mihoreanu.

References

External links

 

1951 births
2022 deaths
Canoeists at the 1972 Summer Olympics
Olympic canoeists of Romania
Olympic bronze medalists for Romania
Romanian female canoeists
Olympic medalists in canoeing
ICF Canoe Sprint World Championships medalists in kayak
Medalists at the 1972 Summer Olympics
People from Tulcea County